Crossan is a surname. Notable people with the surname include:

 Clarence K. Crossan (1876–1960), American Republican politician
 Dalton Crossan (born 1994), American football running back
 Dave Crossan (1940–2019), American football offensive lineman
 Denis Crossan, British cinematographer
 Diana Crossan (born 1949), New Zealand civil servant
 Eddie Crossan (1925–2006), Northern Irish association football player
 Eion Crossan (born 1967), New Zealand rugby union player
 Ernie Crossan (1915–2009), Australian cricketer
 Errol Crossan (1930–2016), Canadian association football player
 Gary Crossan (born 1971), Irish long-distance runner
 Jim Crossan (21st century), Northern Irish association football player and manager
 Jim Crossan (Australian footballer) (1902–1979), Australian rules footballer
 Johnny Crossan (born 1938), Northern Irish author, radio sports analyst, entrepreneur and association football player
 John Dominic Crossan (born 1934), Irish-American religious scholar
 Kate Crossan (21st century), Irish singer and composer
 Keith Crossan (born 1959), Northern Irish rugby union player
 Mark Crossan, Irish Gaelic footballer
 Mura Masa (born 1996), British electronic music producer, real name Alex Crossan
 Paddy Crossan (1894–1933), Scottish association football player
 PJ Crossan (born 1998, Scottish association football player
 Rick O'Shea (born 1973), Irish radio personality, real name Paul Crossan
 Rob Crossan (born 1968), Canadian alpine skier
 Sarah Crossan (21st century), Irish author

English-language surnames